Backhousia subargentea (syn. Choricarpia subargentea) is a rare Australian rainforest tree, growing near Mullumbimby in north eastern New South Wales and from Boonah to Imbil in south eastern Queensland.

Common names include giant ironwood, ironwood box, scrub ironwood and lancewood.  The New South Wales habitat of Backhousia subargentea is dry rainforest thickets on hillsides near Mullumbimby. It grows in association with the shatterwood and wild quince.

Description 

Backhousia subargentea is a small tree to medium tree, occasionally reaching 30 metres in height. However, it is much smaller in New South Wales, reaching only 8 metres high and with a stem diameter of 20 cm. The trunk is often multi-stemmed and crooked, not cylindrical in cross section with some buttressing at the base.

The trunk can be smooth and glossy, of an attractive orange/brown or pinkish/mauve colour, or green where bark has recently been shed. Other times, the bark sheds irregularly resulting in a mottled trunk, similar to the spotted gum and the leopardwood.

The leaves are opposite, simple and entire, lanceolate or broad with a fine leaf tip, around 4 to 8 cm long. The leaves are glossy dark green above, and greyish fawn below. Crushed leaves have a familiar eucalyptus scent. (Both plants being dry fruited myrtles). Oil dots are evident when viewed with a magnifying glass. The midrib and lateral leaf venation is only visible on the top surface. An intramarginal vein surrounds the leaf, about 2 mm from the edge. Leaf stalks are 5 to 10 mm long, with scaly matter on the stalk.

Flowers are white, densely together in globular heads, 5 to 8 mm long, appearing in April. The fruit matures around six months later as a small dry capsule, 5 mm in diameter on a stalk 6 to 10 mm long.

Uses
If not so rare, it could possibly be used as an ornamental tree.

References

Further reading
  (other publication details, included in citation)
 PlantNET - The Plant Information Network System of Botanic Gardens Trust, Sydney, Australia - 5 August 2009. http://plantnet.rbgsyd.nsw.gov.au/cgi-bin/NSWfl.pl?page=nswfl&lvl=sp&name=Choricarpia~subargentea
 NSW Threatened Species: http://www.threatenedspecies.environment.nsw.gov.au/tsprofile/profile.aspx?id=10166

Myrtales of Australia
Trees of Australia
Flora of New South Wales
Flora of Queensland
Endangered biota of Queensland
Endangered flora of Australia
subargentea